The thrombopoietin receptor also known as the myeloproliferative leukemia protein or CD110 (Cluster of Differentiation 110) is a protein that in humans is encoded by the MPL (myeloproliferative leukemia virus) oncogene.

Discovery 

In 1990 an oncogene, v-mpl, was identified from the murine myeloproliferative leukemia virus that was capable of immortalizing bone marrow hematopoietic cells from different lineages. In 1992 the human homologue, named, c-mpl, was cloned. Sequence data revealed that c-mpl encoded a protein that was homologous with members of the hematopoietic receptor superfamily. Presence of anti-sense oligodeoxynucleotides of c-mpl inhibited megakaryocyte colony formation.

Function 

The ligand for c-mpl, thrombopoietin, was cloned in 1994. Thrombopoietin was shown to be the major regulator of megakaryocytopoiesis and platelet formation.

The protein encoded by the c-mpl gene, CD110, is a 635 amino acid transmembrane domain, with two extracellular cytokine receptor domains and two intracellular cytokine receptor box motifs . TPO-R deficient mice were severely thrombocytopenic, emphasizing the important role of CD110 and thrombopoietin in megakaryocyte and platelet formation. Upon binding of thrombopoietin, CD110 is dimerized and the JAK family of non-receptor tyrosine kinases, as well as the STAT family, the MAPK family, the adaptor protein Shc and the receptors themselves become tyrosine phosphorylated.

Interactions 
Myeloproliferative leukemia virus oncogene has been shown to interact with:
 ATXN2L
 JAK2
 thrombopoietin

Clinical relevance 

Inactivating mutations in this gene have been shown to cause familial aplastic anemia.

Specific mutations to this gene are associated with myelofibrosis and essential thrombocythemia. In essential thrombocythemia, mutations occur at position 505 or 515 in the protein. In myelofibrosis, a mutation occurs at position 515. 
These mutations lead to the production of thrombopoietin receptors that are permanently activated, which results in the overproduction of abnormal megakaryocytes.

See also
 Cluster of differentiation
 Congenital amegakaryocytic thrombocytopenia

References

Further reading

External links
 

Clusters of differentiation